Chhath is an ancient Hindu festival historically native to the Indian subcontinent, more specifically, the Indian states of Bihar, Uttar Pradesh, West Bengal, Jharkhand, and the Nepalese provinces of Madhesh and Lumbini. Prayers during Chhath puja are dedicated to the solar deity, Surya, to show gratitude and thankfulness for bestowing the bounties of life on earth and to request that certain wishes be granted.

Chhathi Maiya, the sixth form of Devi Prakriti and Lord Surya's sister is worshipped as the Goddess of the festival. It is celebrated six days after Deepavali, on the sixth day of the lunar month of Kartika (October–November) in the Hindu calendar Vikram Samvat. The rituals are observed over four days. They include holy bathing, fasting and abstaining from drinking water (vrata), standing in water, and offering prasad (prayer offerings) and arghya to the setting and rising sun. Some devotees also perform a prostration march as they head for the river banks.

Environmentalists have claimed that the festival of Chhath is one of the most eco-friendly religious festivals in the World.  All devotees prepare similar prasada (religious food) and offerings. Although the festival is observed most widely in the Terai region of Nepal and the Indian states of Bihar, Uttar Pradesh, West Bengal, and Jharkhand, it is also prevalent in areas where the diaspora and migrants from those areas have a presence. It is celebrated in all northern regions and major north Indian urban centers like Delhi. Hundreds of thousands of people celebrate it in Mumbai.

Significance 
Chhath puja is dedicated to the sun god Surya. The sun is visible to every being and is the basis of life of all creatures on earth. Along with the Sun God, Chhathi Maiya is also worshipped on this day. According to Vedic astrology, Chhathi Maiya (or Chhathi Mata) protects the children from diseases and problems and gives them long lives and good health.

As per legends, Chhath Puja stems from the early Vedic period, where sages would fast for days and perform the puja with mantras from Rigveda. It is believed that Chhath Puja was also performed by Karna, the son of Lord Surya and the king of Anga Desh, which is the modern-day Bhagalpur in Bihar. According to another legend, Pandavas and Draupadi also performed the Puja to overcome obstacles in their lives and reclaim their lost kingdom. For the people from Bihar and other close by areas, Chhath Puja is considered as Mahaparva.

Description 

Chhath Puja is a folk festival that lasts four days. It starts with Kartik Shukla Chaturthi and ends with Kartik Shukla Saptami. Chhath is celebrated twice in a year.
 Chaiti Chhath - It is observed in the Chaitra month of Vikram Samvat.
 Kartik Chhath - It is celebrated at a very large scale in the Kartika month of Vikram Samvat.

Nahaay Khaay (Day 1) 
This is the first day of Chhath Puja. The Parvaitin (from Sanskrit parv, meaning "occasion" or "festival") must take a holy bath, after which the entire house, its surroundings and pathways to the Ghat are thoroughly cleaned. The Parvaitin usually cooks Sattvik Lauka Bhaat (Bottle Gourd and Bengal Gram Lentil preparation with Arva Rice Bhaat). This preparation is served to the deity in the afternoon as Bhog. This initiates the Parv and is the last meal of the Parvaitin during Chhath Puja. The food is then eaten to protect the mind from thoughts of vengeance.

Rasiaav-Roti/Kharna/Lohanda (Day 2) 
Kharna, also known as Rasiaav-Roti or Lohanda, is the second day of Chhath Puja. On this day, the devotees are not allowed to drink even a single drop of water. In the evening, they eat gur ke kheer (Kheer made up of jaggery), called Rasiaav, together with Roti.

Sanjhka Aragh (Day 3) 

This day is spent preparing the prasad (offerings) at home, often consisting of a bamboo basket decorated with fruits, Thekua and rice laddus. On the eve of this day, the entire household accompany the devotee to a riverbank, pond, or other large body of water to make the Arghya offerings to the setting sun. The occasion can in many ways resemble a carnival. Besides the devotees and their friends and family, numerous participants and onlookers are all willing to help and receive the blessings of the worshipper.

At the time of arghya, Gangajal water is offered to Sun God and the Chhathi Maiya is worshipped with the prasad. After the worship of Sun God, Chhath songs are sung in the night and the Vrat katha is read.

After returning home the devotees perform the ritual of kosi bharai together with the other family members. They take 5 to 7 sugarcanes and tie them together to form a mandap and beneath the shade of that mandap, 12 to 24 Diya lamps are burnt and thekua and other seasonal fruits are offered. The same ritual is repeated the next morning between 3 am and 4 am, and afterward the devotees offer arghya or other offerings to the rising sun.

Bhorka Aragh (Day 4) 
Before sunrise on the last day of Chhath puja, the devotees have to go to the riverbank to offer an arghya to the rising sun. After this, the protection of the child and the peace and happiness of the entire family is sought from Chhatti Maiya. After worship, devotees drink water and eat a little prasad in order to break one's fast. This is called Paran or Parana.

Rituals and traditions 
The main worshippers, called  (from Sanskrit parv, meaning "occasion" or "festival"), are usually women. However, many men also observe this festival as Chhath is not a gender-specific festival. The  pray for the well-being of their family, and for the prosperity of their children.

In some communities, once a family member starts performing Chhath Puja, they are duty-bound to perform it every year and to pass it on to the following generations. The festival is skipped only if there is a death in the family that year. If the person stops performing the ritual on any particular year, it stops permanently and one cannot resume it. In other communities, this is not mandatory.

The prasad offerings include Thekua, Khajuria, Tikri, Kasar (and fruits (mainly sugar canes, sweet lime, coconut, banana and many seasonal fruits) offered in small bamboo baskets. The food is strictly vegetarian and is cooked without salt, onions or garlic. Emphasis is put on maintaining the purity of the food.

History and associated legends 
The Chhathi Maiya is worshipped on the Chhath festival, which is also mentioned in the Brahma Vaivarta Purana. It is said that the Chhath Puja was started in the holy city of Varanasi by Gahadavala dynasty.

In Munger region, the festival is known for its association with Sita Manpatthar (Sita Charan; lit. Sita's footsteps). Sitacharan temple, situated on a boulder in the middle of the Ganges in Munger, is the main center of public faith regarding Chhath festival. It is believed that goddess Sita performed Chhath festival in Munger. It was only after this event that Chhath festival started. That is why Chhath Mahaparva is celebrated with great pomp in Munger and Begusarai.

According to some other legend, King Priyavrat, son of First Manu Swayambhu, was very sad because he had no children. Maharishi Kashyap asked him to do a yajna. According to Maharishis orders, he performed a yajna for a son. After this, Queen Malini gave birth to a son, but unfortunately the baby was born dead. The king and his family were very sad because of this. Then Mata Shashthi revealed herself in the sky. When the king prayed to her, she spoke, saying: "I am Chhathi Maiya the Sixth form of Devi Parvati. I protect all the children of the world and give the blessings of children to all childless parents." After this, the Goddess blessed the lifeless child with her hands, so that he came to life. The king was very thankful for the grace of the Goddess and he worshipped the goddess Shashthi Devi. It is believed that after this puja, this festival became a worldwide celebration.

Chhath has been mentioned in both the major Indian epics. In Ramayana, when Rama and Sita returned Ayodhya, people celebrated Deepawali, and on its sixth day Ramrajya (lit. Kingdom of Rama) was established. On this day Rama and Sita kept fast and Surya Shashthi/Chhath Puja was performed by Sita. Hence, she was blessed with Lava and Kush as their sons.

While in the Mahabharata, Chhath Puja was performed by Kunti after they escaped from Lakshagriha. It is also believed that Karna, the son of Surya and Kunti, was conceived after Kunti performed Chhath puja. Draupadi is also said to perform the Puja for Pandavas to win the Kurukshetra War.

References

Further reading 

Culture of Bihar
Culture of Mithila
Festivals in Bihar
Hindu festivals
Hindu festivals in Nepal
October observances
November observances
Public holidays in Nepal
Religious festivals in India
Water and Hinduism
Culture of Madhesh
Culture of Lumbini